This is a list of American television-related events in 1947.

Events

Television programs

Debuts

Television stations

Station launches

Births

Deaths

References

External links 
List of 1947 American television series at IMDb